The Daphné-class submarine was a class of the diesel-electric powered submarines designed and constructed by the French defense contractor, DCNS, for the French Navy in 1964. Marketed by the French government for the export market, the Daphné design went on to serve in South Africa while there were subclasses based on the Daphné design that were commissioned in the navies of Pakistan, Portugal, and Spain.

History
Eleven were used by France. Boats of this design were sold to several other countries: Pakistan (3), Portugal (4), South Africa (3) and Spain (4). However, two ( 1970 and  1968) sank accidentally and brought sales to an end. The cause was eventually considered to have been a faulty snorkel design. The submarines were scrapped in the 1990s and Portugal sold one of its boats to Pakistan.  sank the Indian frigate  during the 1971 Indo-Pakistani war. Pakistan has now retired the submarine and is replacing it.

Design features
Besides its eight torpedo tubes forward, this submarine class has four in the stern. All are for torpedoes of the French  diameter; while the forward tubes hold full-length torpedoes (either against ship either against submarine), the stern tubes hold only shortened ones (only against submarine, in autodefense).

The forward diving planes are located below the midplane of the hull. Unlike those of modern German submarines, which are similarly located, they function by tilting and cannot retract; neither do they fold.

Ships

French Navy
S641 Daphné – completed 1964,decommissioned 1989
 S642 Diane – completed 1964, decommissioned 1989
 S643 Doris – completed 1964, decommissioned 1994
 S644  – completed 1964 – lost in an accident on  4 March 1970
 S645 Flore – completed 1964, decommissioned 1989, preserved as museum ship in Lorient, France
 S646 Galatée – completed 1964, decommissioned 1991
 S647  – completed 1964, lost in an accident on 27 January 1968
 S648 Junon – completed 1966, decommissioned 1996
 S649 Vénus – completed 1966, decommissioned 1990
 S650 Psyché – completed 1970,  decommissioned 1996
 S651 Sirène – completed 1970, decommissioned 1996

Pakistan Navy
The Pakistan Navy Hangor-class was formed of three submarines built in France and one acquired from Portugal in the mid-1970s

 S131  – completed 1970, decommissioned 2006 and placed in Pakistan Maritime Museum
 S132  – completed 1970, decommissioned 2006 
 S133  – completed 1970,  decommissioned 2006
 S134   - Portuguese Cachalote acquired in 1975, decommissioned 2006

Portuguese Navy
The four s of the Portuguese Navy were built in France using the Daphne design. They formed the 4th Submarine Flotilla.

South African Navy
Three submarines were built by France for South Africa.

S97 SAS Maria van Riebeeck, renamed  
completed 1970, decommissioned by 2003
S98 SAS Emily Hobhouse, renamed  
completed 1970, decommissioned by 2003
S99 SAS Johanna van der Merwe, renamed 
completed 1971, decommissioned by 2003, converted to museum ship

Spanish Navy
Four submarines were built for the Spanish Navy by Bazan at Cartagena dockyard. In Spain is named Delfín class (S-60).

S61 Delfín
completed 1973 – decommissioned 2003, since 2004 a museum ship at Torrevieja
S62 Tonina
completed 1973. decommissioned 2005, to be museum ship at Cartagena
S63 Marsopa
completed 1975. decommissioned 2006
S64 Narval – completed 1975 – decommissioned 2003

Image gallery

See also 

List of submarines of France

References

External links

 Sous-marin Minerve : Caractéristiques principales

Submarine classes
 
 
Ship classes of the French Navy